The Waipa Foundation is a non-profit organization which sponsors a program called Aina Ulu (in the Hawaiian language), funded by Kamehameha Schools.

Its programs grew out of community efforts to manage the ahupuaa of Waipa in the late 1980s. The Waipa Foundation was established as a 501(c)3 non-profit in 1993.

The program
The foundation makes its home in the ahupuaa of Waipa, a valley on the north shore of the island of Kauai in Hawaii, . The Waipa stream flows through the valley and empties into Hanalei Bay. An ahupuaa is an ancient Hawaiian land division from mountains to the sea, often corresponding to a watershed district. It was used in traditional Hawaiian times as a way to distribute the resources of the land to the people. The mission of the foundation is "the physical and cultural restoration of the ahupuaa of Waipa".

Ecological restoration
The restoration project at Waipa focuses on human interactions with plants and land.  There are three types of sites.  The first is native reforestation.  Some of the plants being out planted are Acacia koa (Koa), Dodonaea viscosa (A'ali'i), Munroidendron racemosum, Pritchardia spp.(Loulu), and Microlepia strigosa (Palapalai). Some sites feature Polynesian introduction plants, such as Piper methysticum (Kawa) and Cordyline fruticosa (Ti).  These plants all have value in Hawaiian ethnobiology.  The last designation of restoration sites is agroforestry.  Waipa is planting fruit and timber trees to satisfy this category.  All of the agroforestry plantings are plants with commercial value.  They can be harvested and sold as well as provide food and medicine.  By planting the trees, Waipa community is rehabilitating the land as well as providing for the community.

References

Environmental organizations based in Hawaii
Kauai
1993 establishments in Hawaii